Jeanne d'Arc Dijon Handball (also known as JDA Dijon Handball, formerly Cercle Dijon Bourgogne Handball) is a French handball club from Dijon, France. This team currently competes in the French Women's Handball First League from 2014 and they play their home matches in Palais des Sports de Dijon. Current head coach is Christophe Mazel.

The club became in 2018, affiliated with the male basketball team JDA Dijon Basket and changed the official club name.

Summer 2022, both clubs changed their names again, adding "Bourgogne" to them. The club renamed itself to JDA Dijon Bourgogne Handball.

Results
French Women's First League Championship:
Third place (3): 1993, 2002, 2003
Division 2 Féminine:
Winners (2): 1987, 2014
Runner-up (1): 1998
Coupe de France:
Runner-up (3): 2002, 2007, 2013
Coupe de la Ligue:
Runner-up (2): 2003, 2007
Semifinalist (1): 2008
Women's EHF Cup:
Silver Medalist: 1993
Semifinalist: 1994
Women's EHF Challenge Cup:
Silver Medalist: 2005

Team

Current squad
Squad for the season 2022-23 - Professional players

Goalkeepers
 12  Kristy Zimmerman 
 24  Manuella Dos Reis 
Wingers
LW
 5  Elise Delorme
RW
 22  Rosario Urban
Line players
 7  Elisabet Cesáreo
 26  Sarah Valero Jodar

Back players
LB
 2  Stine Nørklit Lønborg
 4  Claire Vautier
CB
 10  Carmen Campos
 18  Ilona Di Rocco
RB
 9  Manon Gravelle
 93  Celine Sivertsen

Transfers
Transfers for the 2023–24 season

 Joining

 Leaving
  Laura Lasm (LB) (to  CSM Corona Brașov (women's handball)) (with immediate effect) 
  Elise Delorme (LW) (to  Stella Saint-Maur Handball)

Technical staff
Staff for the 2022-23 season.
 Head coach: Christophe Mazel
 Assistant coach: Anthony Favier
 Assistant coach: Jean-Raphaël Soupault
 Physical coach: Pierre Terzi
 Physical coach: Vianney Varanguin
 Sporting director: Christophe Maréchal

Personnel 

 President :
 Michel Amico (1994–2014)
 Thierry Degorce (2018– )
 Vice-president : Clément Forgeneuf (?–?)
 Coach :
 Christophe Maréchal (? –2019)
 Christophe Mazel (2019–)
 Assistant coach :
 Christophe Maréchal (? –2022)
 Anthony Favier (2022–)
 Academy director : Anthony Favier
 Sporting director : Christophe Maréchal

Notable former players 

  Béatrice Edwige (2009–2014)
  Marie Prouvensier (2010–2016)
  Florence Sauval (1994–1996)

References

External links
 

French handball clubs
Sport in Dijon
Handball clubs established in 1996
1996 establishments in France